Steve O'Rourke ( – ) was an English music manager and racing driver. He is known for being the manager of Pink Floyd, a position he held from 1968 until his death. Among his accomplishments was negotiating Pink Floyd's split with bass player and main songwriter Roger Waters.

Life and Pink Floyd manager
O'Rourke's father, Tommy O'Rourke, was a fisherman on the Aran Islands off the West of Ireland. He travelled to London for the premiere of the Robert Flaherty documentary film, Man of Aran, in which he appeared as a shark hunter. He settled in London, where Steve was born in the suburb of Willesden.

O'Rourke trained as an accountant and went to work with Bryan Morrison Agency, which became a part of NEMS Enterprises, as a junior agent and book keeper. Initially O'Rourke booked gigs for Pink Floyd, while the band was managed by Peter Jenner and Andrew King. When Pink Floyd parted company with Syd Barrett in 1968, King and Jenner remained with Barrett, and O'Rourke took over managing the band. In the early 1970s, O'Rourke left NEMS, and founded his own company, EMKA Productions, named after his first daughter Emma Kate. (O'Rourke subsequently fathered another daughter and three sons).

O'Rourke suffered a stroke and died in Miami, Florida, in 2003. His funeral service was held on 14 November 2003 at Chichester Cathedral in Sussex, England, where, as a tribute, Pink Floyd members David Gilmour, Richard Wright and Nick Mason performed together in public for the first time since October 1994. They played "Fat Old Sun" and "The Great Gig in the Sky", with Dick Parry playing the saxophone as he followed the coffin.

David Gilmour's 2006 solo album On an Island was dedicated to O'Rourke's memory (as well as memories of tour manager Tony Howard and arranger/orchestrator Michael Kamen). Nick Mason's book Inside Out: A Personal History of Pink Floyd was also dedicated to O'Rourke.

Racing career
O'Rourke also built a highly successful parallel career as an enthusiastic gentleman racing driver – a lifelong passion which he shared with the Floyd's drummer Nick Mason and, to a lesser extent, with David Gilmour. He adored historic racing with cars of the 1950s, 1960s and 1970s.

His ambition to compete at the Le Mans 24 Hours was realised in 1979 when he finished twelfth in his Ferrari 512 BB. His car completed the race wearing green forward bodywork and a red tail.

In 1981 he founded EMKA Racing and began competition in a BMW M1 with Derek Bell. For Le Mans he was joined by David Hobbs and Eddie Jordan. O'Rourke left the circuit on the night of the race to oversee a Pink Floyd concert in London, then flew back the next morning and jumped straight into the car for another two-hour driving stint.

In 1982 he contested two rounds of the British Formula One Championship.

His team later became supported by Aston Martin and he assisted in the construction of a Group C sportscar for Le Mans in 1983. The car saw success by 1985, when it briefly led the 24-Hours in the hands of co-driver Tiff Needell and finished ahead of the works-backed Jaguars, to O'Rourke's great amusement. However, the team folded soon after when Aston Martin left the project.

In 1991 he and David Gilmour co-drove a Jaguar C-Type in the PanAmerican retro race through Mexico, surviving a dramatic crash with only a broken leg. The events were covered in La Carrera Panamericana—a film about the race, which included a soundtrack of previously released tracks and new tracks from Pink Floyd.

In 1991 he resurrected EMKA Racing and begin varied participation in the British GT Championship, BPR Global GT Series and FIA GT Championship. He earned the British GT GT2 class drivers championship with co-driver Tim Sugden in 1997, then again in the GT1 class in 1998. However O'Rourke's greatest racing success came while co-driving a McLaren F1 GTR at Le Mans with Tim Sugden and Bill Auberlen to finish fourth overall. Having saved money by refusing the costly update pack for the McLaren, O'Rourke typically spent as much again on a huge party for all concerned in the EMKA team's success.

From 2000 O'Rourke concentrated on the FIA GT Championship driving an until he was forced to retire from driving for health reasons; he then presided over the drivers Tim Sugden, Martin Short and factory Porsche driver Emmanuel Collard as they won at Pergusa and Anderstorp. Porsche responded by offering racing assistance to the EMKA factory for the 2004 season, to the delight of O'Rourke.

O'Rourke's death soon after the end of the 2003 season led to the shutdown of EMKA Racing.

Other artists

Other artists managed by O'Rourke include:
Chris Thomas, record producer
Kokomo, band
Heath Lefke, production manager

References

External links
 Steve O'Rourke obituary, The Telegraph

English music managers
1940 births
2003 deaths
24 Hours of Le Mans drivers
British GT Championship drivers
People from Willesden
World Sportscar Championship drivers
English people of Irish descent
English racing drivers
English Formula One drivers
British Formula One Championship drivers
Pink Floyd
20th-century English businesspeople